Susan Joy Hassol is an American author and award-winning science communicator best known for her work around climate change. Hassol is the Director of Climate Communication and was the Senior Science Writer on the first three U.S. National Climate Assessments.

Early life and education 
Susan Hassol was born in January 1959 in Brooklyn, New York to Harriette Hassol, a long time public school teacher, and Edwin Hassol, who worked with his parents in their family furniture store in Brooklyn. The family moved to Long Island where she graduated from Lawrence High School in 1977. She then attended Syracuse University, graduating summa cum laude with a bachelor's degree in Public Communication and Public Affairs in 1981. She worked in energy efficiency at Sun Shares in Durham, NC. She completed one semester of law school at the University of North Carolina in Chapel Hill, but then, inspired by the work of Rocky Mountain Institute on energy efficiency and renewables, she left law school and moved to Aspen, Colorado.

Career 
Hassol began working as a contractor for the Rocky Mountain Institute, writing home energy briefs that informed people how to save energy in their homes. She also worked at the Windstar Foundation with John Denver, where she wrote a series of handbooks entitled "Creating a Healthy World," each book addressing greener ways to live with energy, water, recycling, and everyday chemicals, providing readers with simple things they can do in their daily lives to make a difference on the environment. Hassol worked for IRT: The Energy Newsbrief, where she wrote a weekly digest of strategic developments in the energy field. Hassol then went to work at the Aspen Global Change Institute (AGCI), where she received an intensive education on climate change from hundreds of scientists, and synthesized large amounts of scientific information, communicating it in a clear and concise way.

As she continued her career in climate science communication, Hassol's work became policy relevant as she testified to the Senate Commerce Committee, prepared others to testify in front of Congress, authored Impacts of A Warming Arctic, the synthesis report of the Arctic Climate Impact Assessment, and wrote the first three National Climate Assessments in 2000, 2009, and 2014. In 2006, Hassol wrote the HBO documentary Too Hot Not to Handle. In 2015, she gave a TEDx talk discussing climate communication and solutions. Hassol is the director of Climate Communication LLC, and leads workshops for journalists under the National Science Foundation-funded project Climate Matters in the Newsroom, intending to guide journalists in accurately communicating climate impacts and solutions on a local level. She works with many leading climate scientists, including Michael Mann, Katharine Hayhoe, Richard Somerville, and Jerry Melillo. She continues to be an analyst, communicator, and author known for her ability to communicate complex scientific issues in ways that are understandable to the public and policymakers alike.

Hassol continues to work with journalists, scientists, and others to educate them on the importance of framing and word choice - in particular scientists, as to how they can more effectively communicate climate science to non-scientists - through workshops and trainings, interviews, articles, op-eds (e.g. Doomsday scenarios are as harmful as climate change denial in the Washington Post).

Hassol is a member of the American Meteorological Society, the American Association for the Advancement of Science, and the American Geophysical Union, where she served in the past on the Board of Directors.

Awards and honors
 2021: Honored with the prestigious Ambassador Award from the American Geophysical Union for her tireless efforts to improve communication of climate change science and solutions."
 2012: Elected Fellow of the American Association of the Advancement of Science (AAAS) for her "exceptional contributions in the area of science communication, particularly for communication of the science of climate change to policymakers and the public."
 2006: Received the Climate Institute's first ever award for climate science communication

Selected publications
Heat wave bakes one-third of Americans, highlighting urgency of climate legislation, Hassol and Mann 2022, The Hill
Now Is Not the Time To Give in to Climate Fatalism, Hassol and Mann 2022, TIME
Lost time means a steeper climb on climate, Mann and Hassol 2022, The Hill
Glasgow’s hope at a critical moment in the climate battle, Mann and Hassol 2021, Los Angeles Times
Let’s emerge from Glasgow still in the fight, Hassol and Mann 2021, Boston Globe
Three Things We Must Do to Tackle Climate Change, Hassol and Melillo 2021, Scientific American
America’s Next Great Migrations Are Driven by Climate Change, Khanna and Hassol 2021, Scientific American
America in 2090: The Impact of Extreme Heat, in Maps, Hassol, Ebi, and Serkez 2021, The New York Times
That Heat Dome? Yeah, It’s Climate Change., Mann & Hassol 2021, The New York Times
Climate Trumps Everything, Mann & Hassol 2016, Scientific American
(Un)Natural Disasters: Communicating Linkages between extreme events and climate change, Hassol, Torok, Lewis, & Luganda, 2016, WMO
Communicating the Science of Climate Change, Somerville & Hassol 2011, Physics Today
 Improving How Scientists Communicate About Climate Change, Hassol 2011, EOS
What We Know about the Climate Change-Hurricane Connection Mann, Peterson & Hassol 2017, Scientific American
Irma and Harvey should kill any doubt that climate change is real Mann, Hassol, Peterson, 2017, Washington Post
Arctic Climate Feedbacks: Global Implications (Editors: Sommerkorn & Hassol) 2011

References 

1959 births
Living people
American science writers
Syracuse University alumni
Climate communication